Myconita is a genus of moths in the family Gelechiidae.

Species
Myconita lipara Bradley 1953 (from Fiji)
Myconita plutelliformis Snellen, 1901 (from Australia and Java)

References

 Meyrick, E. 1923. Exotic Microlepidoptera. 3(1-2): 1-32, 33-64.
 www.theworldofbutterflies.nl

Dichomeridinae
Moth genera